Harry Peter Williams (June 23, 1890 – December 21, 1963) was an American professional baseball player. Born in Omaha, Nebraska, he played a total of 85 games over two years for the New York Yankees as a first baseman. He made his major league debut on August 7, 1913 and played his last game June 30, 1914. The six foot, one inch tall Williams had a career batting average of .192 with 29 runs batted in over 260 at bats. The right-handed hitter and fielder hit two home runs, three triples, and eight doubles while stealing nine bases. Harry Williams died on December 21, 1963, at the age of 73 in Huntington Park, California, and was buried at the Holy Sepulchre Cemetery in his hometown of Omaha. His brother, Gus Williams, also played in the Major Leagues.

References

External links

1890 births
1963 deaths
Baseball players from Nebraska
Sportspeople from Omaha, Nebraska
New York Yankees players
Major League Baseball first basemen
Maysville Rivermen players
Galveston Pirates players
Galveston Sand Crabs players
Lincoln Tigers players
Wichita Witches players